Brian A. Cunningham (born December 16, 1984) is an American politician serving as a member of the New York State Assembly from the 43rd district. He assumed office on March 30, 2022, succeeding Diana Richardson.

Early life and education 
Born in New York City, Cunningham was raised in the Flatbush neighborhood of Brooklyn. The son of immigrants from Jamaica, Cunningham attended public schools.

Career 
Cunningham worked as an aide for members of the New York State Legislature and as an advocate counselor with CAMBA, Inc.

Cunningham first sought election in 2017 for the 40th district of the New York City Council. He received second place in the Democratic primary to then-incumbent Mathieu Eugene. He then contested the general election after receiving the Reform Party's nomination, with the support of the Working Families Party. He again placed second to the then-incumbent.

He was elected to the New York State Assembly in March 2022, succeeding Diana Richardson.

In 2022, Cunningham endorsed Yuh-Line Niou in the 2022 election in the 10th congressional district but later rescinded his endorsement following Niou's support for Boycott, Divestment and Sanctions (BDS).

References 

Living people
Politicians from New York City
People from Flatbush, Brooklyn
Politicians from Brooklyn
American politicians of Jamaican descent
African-American state legislators in New York (state)
Democratic Party members of the New York State Assembly
1984 births